Australian Seed Conservation and Research (AuSCaR) is an Australian network of agencies involved in the collection, storage, research and sustainable use of seeds for native plant conservation.  It is a member of the Kew-based Millennium Seed Bank Partnership.  It was established in 2007 to assist with seed-banking and ex-situ plant conservation of the Australian flora.  The aim of the network is focused particularly on achieving Target 8 of the Global Strategy for Plant Conservation by 2010: "60% of threatened plant species in assessable ex-situ collections, preferably in the country of origin, and 10% of them included in recovery and restoration programs".

References

External links
 AuSCaR
 Israel Gene Bank
 Australian Native Seeds

Conservation in Australia

2007 establishments in Australia